Alexander E. Martin (October 9, 1867after 1830) was a member of the Wisconsin State Senate.

Career
Martin was born in Two Rivers, Wisconsin and represented the 8th district of the Senate from 1913 to 1916. Additionally, he was a member of the Milwaukee School Board and a Milwaukee supervisor. In 1906, Martin was an unsuccessful candidate for Treasurer of Milwaukee. He was a Republican.

In 1930, Martin sued a local physician with whom he had a car accident; Martin asserted that "he probably never will be able to walk again as the result of injuries to his right leg".

References

People from Two Rivers, Wisconsin
Politicians from Milwaukee
County supervisors in Wisconsin
Republican Party Wisconsin state senators
School board members in Wisconsin
1867 births
Year of death missing